Ranipokhari Corner Team is a Nepalese football club from Kathmandu. It is the second-most successful team in the history of the Martyr's Memorial A-Division League, having won the title six times. In 2013–14, facing serious financial problems, the team was relegated from the Nepalese top division, the Nepal A- Division League.

The club is the oldest

The club was named after its location at the corner of Ranipokhari of Kathmandu.

Honours

National 
 Martyr's Memorial A-Division League:
 Champions: 1971–72, 1972–73, 1973–74, 1979, 1981–82, 1984

Martyr's Memorial B-Division League :
Champions: 2019

Invitational
 Budha Subba Gold Cup:
Champions: 2010
 Khukuri Gold Cup:
Champions: 1998

League finishes 
The season-by-season performance of RCT since 2000:

Performance in AFC competitions
 Asian Club Championship: 1 appearance
1991: Qualifying stage

References

Football clubs in Nepal
1932 establishments in Nepal